Commission scolaire des Navigateurs was a French-language school district in Lévis, Quebec, Canada. Its  address was in Saint-Romuald, a former town annexed to Lévis. The chair of the school board was Jérôme Demers, and the director general was Esther Lemieux.

In January 2007, the school board adopted a food policy which banned "junk food" such as poutine and hot dogs from school cafeterias.

In 2020, the school board was replaced by the centre de services scolaire des Navigateurs.

Schools
It operated the following schools.

High schools
École secondaire de l'Aubier
École secondaire Beaurivage
École secondaire Champagnat
École secondaire de l'Envol
École secondaire de l'Horizon
École de la Clé-du-Boisé
École secondaire Guillaume-Couture
École secondaire les Etchemins
École secondaire Pamphile-Le May
École Pointe-Lévy
École Îlot des Appalaches
Centre de formation en entreprise et récupération (CFER)

Elementary schools
École Belleau
École Charles-Rodrigue
École Clair-Soleil
École de l'Alizé
École de l'Amitié
École de l'Auberivière
École de l'Épervière
École de l'Odyssée
École de la Berge
École de la Caravelle (Dosquet)
École de la Caravelle (Joly)
École de la Caravelle (Saint-Flavien)
École de la Chanterelle
École de la Clé-d'Or
École de la Clé-du-Boisé
École de la Falaise
École de la Nacelle
École de la Rose-des-Vents
École de la Ruche
École de la Source
École de Taniata
École Desjardins
École des Moussaillons
École des Mousserons
École des Petits-Cheminots
École du Bac
École du Boisé
École du Chêne
École du Grand-Fleuve Pavillon du Méandre
École du Grand-Fleuve Pavillon Maria-Dominique
École du Grand-Voilier
École du Ruisseau
École du Tournesol
École Étienne-Chartier
École Gagnon
École La Martinière
École La Mennais
École Notre-Dame
École Notre-Dame-d'Etchemin
École des Quatre-Vents
École Plein-Soleil
École Saint-Dominique
École Saint-Joseph
École Saint-Louis-de-France
École Sainte-Hélène
École Sainte-Marie
École Sainte-Thérèse

as well as the Centre de formation en entreprise et récupération and adult education programs.

References

External links
Commission scolaire des Navigateurs Official site, in French.

Lévis, Quebec
Historical school districts in Quebec
Education in Chaudière-Appalaches